Flexcom is a finite element analysis software package used in the offshore oil and gas and marine renewable energy industries. An educational version is also available for universities.

History

The name Flexcom derives from its origins as a computational software initially geared towards the analysis of flexible risers, befitting the emerging riser technology of the North Sea in the early 1980s. Although originally a time domain analysis tool, most versions of Flexcom also incorporate frequency domain analysis capabilities. It is also capable of performing modal analysis and estimating damage caused by fatigue. The first version of the software was released in 1983, and a continuous update program has been maintained since then. As of August 2022, the version on general release is Flexcom 2022.1.1.

Applications

Typical applications include:

Subsea production systems

Steel catenary risers

Drilling risers

Mooring lines

Submarine pipelines

Offshore pipe-laying

Wave energy converters

Floating wind turbines

Solution methodology

Structural model

The global analysis of the system is performed using a finite element solution technique. For a numerical solver to be capable of analysing both flexible materials (such as mooring wires, power cables etc.), and inflexible structures (such as the rigid columns and pontoons of a floating platform), a solution scheme is required which caters for bending stiffness values which are much lower than corresponding axial stiffness values. To achieve this effect, axial force is explicitly included as a solution variable, which is solved for independently of the axial strain. The stress-strain compatibility relationship is applied outside of the virtual work statement by means of a Lagrangian constraint. Torque is handled in a similar manner, which leads to a fourteen degree of freedom hybrid finite element with two end nodes, where the axial force and torque are added to the usual form of a three-dimensional beam-column element. A truss element has also been added in more recent versions of Flexcom. This is essentially a simplified version of the traditional beam element (it does not solve for nodal rotations) which is better suited to structures with very low structural bending stiffness such as mooring chains.

Floating bodies typically undergo significant rigid body motions when subjected to ocean waves, so the numerical solver must also cater for arbitrarily large and non-linear displacements and rotations in three dimensions. This is a key aspect of the structural model which is necessary to ensure accurate modelling of the restoring forces such as effective tension and bending moment. The solver uses a convected coordinate technique to cater for large three-dimensional displacements and rotations. Each element of the finite element discretisation has a local axis system associated with it, which moves with the element as it moves in space and time. The internal and external virtual work statements are written in the convected system, and deformations along the element relative to this system are assumed to be moderate.

Hydrodynamic model

Hydrodynamic loading on the beam elements is based on Morison's equation. Morison's equation is widely established in marine engineering for modelling wave forces on slender offshore structures such as oil and gas export lines and mooring lines. In situations where the body size becomes significant with respect to wavelength, the underlying assumptions become invalid, and the effects of radiation and diffraction must also be considered. 

Hydrodynamic loading on larger bodies is based on the application of Potential theory. Dedicated hydrodynamic modelling packages such as WAMIT solve the velocity potential using a boundary integral equation method, and provide hydrodynamic coefficients which may be subsequently used as inputs by Flexcom. This provides a more detailed model than Morison's equation, and includes wave excitation forces (due to the pressure acting on a still vessel), diffraction forces (caused by disturbances of the wave field due to the presence of the vessel), and radiation damping forces (representing waves caused by oscillations of the vessel itself). Flexcom uses a convolution technique to integrate frequency-dependent added mass and radiation damping terms into the time domain simulation.

Aerodynamic model

Modern versions of Flexcom include a software coupling with OpenFAST, enabling the simulation of offshore wind turbines. OpenFAST is an open source modelling tool developed by the National Renewable Energy Laboratory (NREL). Flexcom has been benchmarked against other simulation codes for modelling a 5MW reference wind turbine hosted on a floating semi-submersible platform  and a fixed steel jacket structure, based on publicly available data from the International Energy Agency (IEA) and NREL.

See also

 List of finite element software packages

References

External links 

 

Finite element method